The 1927 Tour de Hongrie was the third edition of the Tour de Hongrie cycle race and was held from 12 to 15 August 1927. The race started and finished in Budapest. The race was won by László Vida.

Route

General classification

References

1927
Tour de Hongrie
Tour de Hongrie